Chicago Fire may refer to:

 Great Chicago Fire, the fire that burned much of Chicago in 1871
 Iroquois Theatre fire, a fire at a movie theater in 1903
 Chicago Fire FC, a Major League Soccer club
 Chicago Fire Premier, part of the development system for the Chicago Fire FC
 Chicago Fire NPSL, part of the development system for the Chicago Fire FC
 Chicago Fire Juniors, youth club affiliate of the Chicago Fire FC
 Chicago Fire (WFL), an American football team in the defunct World Football League
 Chicago Fire Department
 Chicago Fire (TV series), an American drama series on NBC
 Chicago Fire (AFA), an American football team in the defunct American Football Association

Music
Chicago Fire (Son Seals album), 1980
Chicago Fire (Eric Alexander album), 2013